Ratha Paasam is a 1980 Indian Tamil-language action drama film directed by K. Vijayan, produced by Santhi Narayanasamy and T. Manohar. The film stars Sivaji Ganesan, Sripriya, M. N. Nambiar and Major Sundarrajan. It was released on 14 June 1980.

Plot 
Raja Sr. is an Indian ruler who has two wives, one British and other Indian. He has two sons, one with each. The British wife develops cancer and for her treatment, Raja Sr., leaves to foreign lands. They both die their in an accident leaving the younger Sivaji, known now as Raja, to stay back there and take care of their properties and business overseas.

Back in India, the younger Sivaji is a cop and arrests three notorious criminals played by Nambiar, Mohan Babu and Manohar. They escape from prison, kills everyone in Sivaji's family and leave him for dead. The only surviving persons are his sister, Jayachitra who is overseas studying and Sripriya, his betrothed, who is in the city, studying. Jayachitra, unaware that her benefactor overseas is Raja, befriends his manager Jai Ganesh who has a son but is divorced and marries him with Elder Sivaji's blessings. Sripriya searches and traces the three criminals for vengeance and finds help in fourth Sivaji who is a complete stranger but agrees to help her. After killing two of them, it is revealed that the fourth Sivaji is none other than her own betrothed and he is undercover.

Raja and younger Sivaji take on the threat of Nambiar and kill him along with his henchmen. The Raja too dies in the process leaving everything to the younger Sivaji.

Cast 
Sivaji Ganesan Raja Sr./Raja Jr./Younger son/stranger
Sripriya
M. N. Nambiar
Major Sundarrajan
Thengai Srinivasan
Jai Ganesh
Prameela
Jayachitra
Mohan Babu
Pushpalatha as Senior Sivaji's wife
Manorama

Production 
A number of scenes were filmed in Ganesan's home, Annai Illam.

Soundtrack 
The film's original soundtrack was composed by M. S. Viswanathan, while the lyrics were penned by Kannadasan.

Reception 
Kanthan of Kalki called the screenplay confusing but appreciated some of the songs.

References

External links 
 

1980 films
1980s action drama films
1980s Tamil-language films
Films directed by K. Vijayan
Films scored by M. S. Viswanathan
Indian action drama films